

The Arado SD I was a fighter biplane, developed in Germany in the 1920s. It was intended to equip the clandestine air force that Germany was assembling at Lipetsk. The layout owed something to designer Walter Rethel's time with Fokker. Of conventional configuration, the SD I featured a welded steel tube frame, metal-covered ahead of the cockpit, and fabric-covered aft of it. The wooden sesquiplane wings were braced with N-type interplane struts, without any wires - a typical Fokker feature.

In flight, performance and handling proved disappointing at anything but very low speeds. Questions also arose as to the structural soundness of the design, and development was terminated very soon thereafter.

Specifications

References

 
 World Aircraft Information Files. Brightstar Publishing, London. File 889 Sheet 73
 German Aircraft  between 1919 - 1945

Biplanes
Single-engined tractor aircraft
1920s German fighter aircraft
SD I

de:Arado Ar 64#Arado SD I